The 1980 Avon Championships were the ninth WTA Tour Championships, the annual tennis tournament for the best female tennis players on the 1980 WTA Tour. It was held in the week of 17 March 1980, in Madison Square Garden in New York City, United States. Second-seeded Tracy Austin won the singles title and earner $100,000 first-prize money.

Finals

Singles

 Tracy Austin defeated  Martina Navratilova, 6–2, 2–6, 6–2

Doubles

 Billie Jean King /  Martina Navratilova defeated  Rosemary Casals /  Wendy Turnbull, 6–3, 4–6, 6–3

See also
 1980 Colgate Series Championships

References

External links
 
 International Tennis Federation (ITF) tournament edition details

WTA Tour Championships
Avon Championships
Avon Championships
Avon Championships
1980s in Manhattan
Avon Championships
Madison Square Garden
Sports competitions in New York City
Sports in Manhattan
Tennis tournaments in New York City